St. Peter is a city in Nicollet County, Minnesota, United States. It is 10 miles north of the Mankato – North Mankato metropolitan area. The population was 12,066 at the 2020 census. St. Peter is the county seat of Nicollet County and home to Gustavus Adolphus College. 

U.S. Highway 169 and Minnesota State Highways 22 and 99 are three of the city's main routes.

St. Peter's sister city is Petatlán, Guerrero, Mexico.

Geography

Climate

Demographics

2010 census
As of the census of 2010, there were 11,196 people, 3,491 households, and 2,150 families residing in the city. The racial makeup of the city was 90.1% White, 3.3% African American, 0.6% Native American, 1.6% Asian, 2.3% from other races, and 2.0% from two or more races. Hispanic or Latino of any race were 6.4% of the population.

There were 3,491 households, of which 32.1% had children under the age of 18 living with them, 46.2% were married couples living together, 11.8% had a female householder with no husband present, 3.6% had a male householder with no wife present, and 38.4% were non-families. 29.9% of all households were made up of individuals, and 12.3% had someone living alone who was 65 years of age or older. The average household size was 2.44 and the average family size was 2.99.

The median age in the city was 27.5 years. 19.4% of residents were under the age of 18; 27.1% were between the ages of 18 and 24; 22% were from 25 to 44; 19.9% were from 45 to 64; and 11.6% were 65 years of age or older. The gender makeup of the city was 49.5% male and 50.5% female.

2000 census
As of the census of 2000, there were 9,747 people, 2,978 households, and 1,843 families residing in the city. The racial makeup of the city was 94.17% White, 1.57% African American, 0.43% Native American, 1.53% Asian, 0.03% Pacific Islander, 1.25% from other races, and 1.02% from two or more races. Hispanic or Latino of any race were 3.04% of the population.

There were 2,978 households, out of which 32.0% had children under the age of 18 living with them, 48.7% were married couples living together, 9.8% had a female householder with no husband present, and 38.1% were non-families. 28.7% of all households were made up of individuals, and 12.8% had someone living alone who was 65 years of age or older. The average household size was 2.46 and the average family size was 2.99.

In the city, the population was spread out, with 19.8% under the age of 18, 30.6% from 18 to 24, 21.3% from 25 to 44, 16.5% from 45 to 64, and 11.8% who were 65 years of age or older. The median age was 25 years. For every 100 females, there were 96.7 males. For every 100 females age 18 and over, there were 93.2 males.

The median income for a household in the city was $40,344, and the median income for a family was $51,157. Males had a median income of $33,618 versus $25,789 for females. The per capita income for the city was $16,634. About 4.2% of families and 11.8% of the population were below the poverty line, including 7.3% of those under age 18 and 10.9% of those age 65 or over.

History
He named the new settlement Rock Bend because of the rock formation at the bend of the Minnesota River. Daniel L. Turpin platted and surveyed the town site in 1854. In 1855, a group of St. Paul businessmen interested in promoting the town formed the Saint Peter Company, and the town was renamed St. Peter. The president of the company was Willis A. Gorman, Territorial Governor of Minnesota. Many of St. Peter's streets were named after streets in New York City, including Park Row, Chatham, Broadway, Nassau, and Union. Dodd was originally from Bloomfield, New Jersey. His second wife, Harriett Newell Jones, a native of Cabot, Vermont, was living in New York at the time of their marriage at the Church of the Holy Communion in New York City, which helped fund the church in St. Peter that shares its name.

In 1857, an attempt was made to move the Territory of Minnesota's capital from St. Paul to St. Peter. Gorman owned the land on which the bill's sponsors wanted to build the new capitol building, and at one point had been heard saying, "If the capitol remains in Saint Paul, the territory is worth millions, and I have nothing." At the time, St. Peter, in the territory's central region, was seen as more accessible to far-flung territorial legislators than St. Paul, which was in the extreme east of the territory, on the east bank of the Mississippi River. A bill passed both houses of the Territorial Legislature and was awaiting Gorman's signature. The chairman of the Territorial Council's Enrolled Bills Committee, Joseph J. Rolette of Pembina, took the bill and hid in a St. Paul hotel, drinking and playing cards with some friends as the city police looked fruitlessly for him, until the end of the legislative session, too late for the bill to be signed. Rolette came into the chamber just as the session ended. Today, St. Paul is the state's second-largest city (after neighboring Minneapolis), while St. Peter is a relatively small rural town.

In 1851 the Treaty of Traverse des Sioux was signed between the Sioux (Dakota) and the U.S. Government one mile (1.6 km) north of St. Peter. The Nicollet County Historical Society-Treaty Site History Center is near the site of the signing. But the treaty's promises were not kept. The Dakota became angered and the Dakota War of 1862 began in Cottonwood County. In August 1862 the Dakota attacked the German settlement of New Ulm. A company of volunteers from St. Peter, headed by Dodd, St. Peter's founder, went to New Ulm's defense. Dodd was killed on August 23, 1862, and briefly buried in New Ulm. On November 11, 1862, Dodd was buried with high military honors in St. Peter on the grounds of the Church of the Holy Communion, Episcopal, on land he donated to the church. Dodd, his wife Harriet and two children are buried behind the present stone church built in 1869–70 at 118 North Minnesota Avenue.

In 1866, the legislature established the first "Minnesota Asylum for the Insane" in St. Peter. It was later known as the St. Peter State Hospital, and is now called the St. Peter Regional Treatment Center.

On July 1, 1892, the Sontag Brothers, John Sontag and George Contant, and their partner, Chris Evans, tried to rob a train between St. Peter and Kasota along the Minnesota River. The bandits acquired nothing of value, but their activities came under the review of Pinkerton detectives, and both were apprehended in June 1893 in what is called the Battle of Stone Corral in California.

Governors
St. Peter is known as the home of five governors:
Territorial
Willis Arnold Gorman (1853–1857)
State
Henry Adoniram Swift (1863–1864)
Horace Austin (1870–1874)
Andrew Ryan McGill (1887–1889)
John Albert Johnson (1905–1909)

The best-known of these, Johnson, was born in St. Peter to Swedish-born parents on July 28, 1861. Because of family circumstances, he offered to help his mother raise the family. He left school at a young age and held a variety of jobs. In 1887, he was hired as editor of the St. Peter Herald, the local newspaper. In 1899, he was elected to the State Senate, and served until 1903. In 1904, he was elected Minnesota's 16th governor. He was reelected in 1906 and 1908. He was considered as a possible candidate in the 1912 presidential election, but died as the result of an operation for intestinal adhesions in Rochester, Minnesota, on September 21, 1909. Drs. William James Mayo and Charles Horace Mayo, who came from Le Sueur and were friends with Johnson, performed the operation. After lying in state in the Capitol rotunda, his body was taken to St. Peter for burial. The funeral, held at Union Presbyterian Church, was St. Peter's largest ever, and he was buried near his parents in Greenhill Cemetery. He was survived by his wife, Elinore "Nora" Preston Johnson.

Mayors

Eugene St. Julien Cox 1865–1867 (also served in the state legislature and as a district court judge)
Francis E. Lange 1868–1869
William Schimmell 1870–1872 (First president of First National Bank)
Albert Knight 1873–1875 (Knight Street is named after him)
Addison L. Sackett 1876–1878 (also served as county auditor and in the state legislature)
Azro A. Stone 1879 (also served as county sheriff; Stones' Way and Stones' Park are named after him)
Philip Dick, Sr. 1880–1882
Gustav W. Steinke 1883–1884
Gideon S. Ives 1885 (son-in-law of Governor Henry Swift; served as lieutenant governor 1891–1893)
Joseph A. Mason 1886–1888
Philip Dick, Sr. 1889–1893 (second term as mayor)
Henry Moll 1894–1895 (also served as a probate judge)
Dr. Lewis M. Erickson 1896–1898
Melville G. Hanscome 1899–1900
William H. Mueller 1901–1905
William H. Rounseville 1906
Philip Dick, Sr. 1907–1909 (third term as mayor)
Edward Bornemann 1910–1912
Philip E. Dick, Jr. 1913–1914
Edward Bornemann 1915
Adolph Bornemann 1916–1917
William Haesecke 1918–1920
Lillien M. (Cox) Gault-Wolfe 1921–1922 (first woman mayor in Minnesota, daughter of former mayor E. St. Julien Cox)
Edward Woehler 1921–1930
Dr. Arthur H. Bittner 1931–1933 (Died in Office)
Floyd B. Johnson 1933–1935 (athletic field at St. Peter Middle School (formerly St. Peter Middle/High School) is named after him)
Otto T. Miller 1936–1937
Reuben R. Seibert 1938–1940
Otto T. Miller 1941–1942
Henry B. Seitzer 1942–1943
Andrew Cook 1944 (Died in office)
John R. Faust 1944–1946
Henry E. Wiest 1946
Clifford J. Nutter 1947–1948
Elmer J. Kleifgen 1949–1951
Prof. George W. Anderson 1951–1952 (English professor at Gustavus Adolphus College)
Richard Konechne 1953–1956
Leighton R. Swenson 1957–1958
Mark W. Schaus 1959–1960
George W. Martens 1960–1961
Arthur W. Cook 1962–1963
Lamar Hay 1964–1965
George W. Martens 1966–1970
Douglas C. Pyan 1971–1985
William A. Wettergren 1986–1989
Peter J. Rheaume 1990–1991
Ellery O. Peterson 1992–1995
Jerry K. Hawbaker 1996–2005
Timothy J. Strand 2006–2015
Chuck Zieman 2016–2021
Shanon Nowell 2022–present (Administrator at Gustavus Adolphus College)

Tornado
On March 29, 1998, a tornado struck St. Peter, killing six-year-old Dustin Schneider, injuring dozens more, and damaging much of the town's housing, commercial, and civic buildings. The tornado destroyed 156 single-family houses and 51 apartment units. An additional 362 houses and apartments suffered serious damage and 1,383 houses or apartments had minor damage. The town's three trailer parks were largely spared with no mobile homes destroyed and just two seriously damaged. Major losses included the Old Central School, St. Peter Arts and Heritage Center, St. Peter's Catholic Church, St. Peter Evangelical Lutheran Church, and Johnson Hall at Gustavus Adolphus College.

Churches
Bethany Alliance Church (Christian & Missionary Alliance) Established in 1961, Present church built in 1965, Church renamed Living Truth Fellowship in 2015.
Calvary Baptist Church Established in 1963, Present Church built in 1977
Church of St. Peter (Roman Catholic) Established in 1856, Present church built in 2001
Church of the Holy Communion (Episcopal) Established in 1854 Present church built in 1869–1870
First Lutheran Church (ELCA) Established in 1857 Present Church built in 1965
Good Samaritan United Methodist Church Established in 2010, no church at present time
Sunrise Assembly of God Established in 1934, present church built in 1988
St. Peter's Evangelical Lutheran Church (WELS) Established in 1867, Present church built in 1999
River of Life Lutheran Church (LCMS) Established in 2013 by Our Savior's Lutheran Church of Mankato, has been a member of the Lutheran Church–Missouri Synod since 2016.
Trinity Lutheran Church (ELCA) Established in 1892, Present church built in 1988
Union Presbyterian Church Established in 1869 as a result of the union of two congregations, the First Free Presbyterian Church of Traverse des Sioux Established in 1853, and the First Presbyterian Church of St. Peter Established in 1857. The present church was built in 1871.
Christ Chapel (ELCA) Built from 1959–1961, inaugurated in 1962. On the campus of Gustavus Adolphus College.

Education

St. Peter is the home of Gustavus Adolphus College, a private liberal arts college affiliated with the Evangelical Lutheran Church in America (ELCA) and founded in 1862. The public high school is St. Peter High School. There are two parochial schools in St. Peter: John Ireland Catholic School (K-6), which is associated with the Church of St. Peter, and St. Peter Evangelical Lutheran School (K-8), which along with the church is associated with the Wisconsin Evangelical Lutheran Synod. Veritas et Lux Preparatory School is a private non-denominational (K-12) school.

The first class graduated from St. Peter High School in 1880. The first superintendent of St. Peter Public Schools was Andrew Ryan McGill, who served from 1865 to 1868. McGill was Minnesota's 10th governor from 1887 to 1889.

Scholarship America is based in St. Peter.

Healthcare
Community health care is provided by St. Peter Community Hospital. In 2009 St. Peter Community Hospital was renamed River's Edge Hospital. That same year the construction of a new clinic was begun adjoining the hospital. There is now the River's Edge Clinic and the St. Peter Community Clinic, part of the Mayo Health System.

St. Peter is home to the Minnesota Security Hospital, where those the state declares mentally ill and dangerous are committed.

Benedictine Health Care Center, formerly known as St. Peter Community Health Care Center, is part of the River's Edge Hospital complex. Near the hospital Pheasants' Ridge is an assisted living facility that has a section for patients suffering from memory loss due to Alzheimer's disease and dementia. Other health care facilities in St. Peter include Grandview Good Samaritan Center on Sunrise Drive.

River Valley Birth Center opened in St. Peter in the summer of 2014. It is the region's first free-standing birth center.

Crime

Infrastructure

Transportation
The following routes are within St. Peter:
 U.S. Highway 169
 Minnesota State Highway 22
 Minnesota State Highway 99

Notable people
Alice A. Andrews — pianist, composer, associated with the Andrews Opera Company
Horace Austin — 6th governor of Minnesota
Henry N. Benson — Minnesota Attorney General
Eugene Saint Julien Cox — mayor of St. Peter, state legislator, district court judge
Anne Martell Denver — wife of singer John Denver
Olive Fremstad — opera singer at Metropolitan Opera
Willis Arnold Gorman — 2nd governor of the Minnesota Territory
Camilla Hall — Symbionese Liberation Army member
James M. Hinds — the first congressman assassinated in office
Gideon S. Ives — lieutenant governor of Minnesota, mayor of St. Peter
Carl M. Johnson — politician, farmer, and businessman
John Albert Johnson — 16th governor of Minnesota, presidential candidate, newspaper editor
Verne C. Johnson — politician and lawyer
Andrew Ryan McGill — 10th governor of Minnesota, newspaper editor, state senator
James M. McPherson — Civil War historian and author
Steve Neils — football player for the St. Louis Cardinals
Milt Nielsen — baseball player for the Cleveland Indians 
Allen Quist — former state representative and gubernatorial candidate
Benjamin H. Randall — politician
Rick Rude — professional wrestler
Myer Skoog — inventor of the jump shot
Doug Swenson — politician, lawyer, and judge
Henry A. Swift — 3rd governor of Minnesota, lieutenant governor of Minnesota, state senator
John H. Tolan — politician and lawyer
Earl Witte — football player for the Green Bay Packers

See also
St. Peter Sandstone
The Arboretum at Gustavus Adolphus College, on the campus of Gustavus Adolphus College

References

External links

St. Peter, Minnesota Official City Website
St. Peter Public Schools Official Website

Cities in Nicollet County, Minnesota
Cities in Minnesota
County seats in Minnesota
Mankato – North Mankato metropolitan area
Populated places established in 1853